Paul Haavaoks (12 April 1924 Värska, Setumaa – 30 September 1983) was an Estonian poet.

He did several jobs. In some period he was a member of Saatse Parish executive committee. He was also a member in the editorial office of the newspaper Koit in Põlva. From 1955 he was a professional writer.

Selected works
 1970: poetry collection Sipelgarada ('Ants’ Trail')
 1974: memoir Eelkarastumine ('Prior Tempering')
 1977: poetry collection Kanajala linnajagu ('Kanajala District')

References

1924 births
1983 deaths
Estonian male poets
20th-century Estonian poets
Estonian children's writers
People from Setomaa Parish